is the former president of the International Federation of Red Cross and Red Crescent Societies (IFRC).

Tadateru Konoe is the 50th Head of the Konoe family. President of Japanese Red Cross Society since 2005, Tadateru Konoe has dedicated his entire professional career to domestic and international Red Cross Red Crescent activities. In 2009 and again in 2013, Konoe was elected President of the International Federation of Red Cross and Red Crescent Societies. He was replaced as President of the International Federation of Red Cross and Red Crescent Societies (IFRC) by Francesco Rocca on 6 November 2017.

Family
He was born with the name  and his paternal ancestry can be traced back to the Japanese Imperial Family since the Hosokawa clan is a branch of Seiwa Genji, a branch of the Minamoto clan. His mother, was the second daughter of Fumimaro Konoe. As his maternal uncle  died childless in the Soviet Union in 1956 as a prisoner of war, Tadateru became the heir of his maternal grandfather and used his family name  instead.

The Konoe family is the most senior branch of the Fujiwara clan, a powerful noble family throughout Japanese history. The clan traces its ancestry to Fujiwara no Kamatari.

On 16 December 1966, he married Princess Yasuko of Mikasa, a first cousin of Japanese Emperor Akihito. They have a son named Tadahiro and three grandchildren. Konoe and his wife are fourth cousins once removed as both are descendants of Nabeshima Narinao (1780-1839), the 9th lord of Saga Domain; as both are descendants of the Imperial House of Japan both paternal and maternal lines, they are also more distantly related multiple times over.

Konoe is also a second cousin once removed of the Emperor Akihito, as both of them are descended from Prince Kuni Asahiko of the Kuni-no-miya imperial branch house.

Academic career
Konoe was graduated in 1962 from Gakushuin University in Tokyo Japan.  He received a B.A. degree in Political Science, after which he attended the London School of Economics in 1964 where he majored in International Relations. In 1994, he was lecturer on Micro study on International Relief Organizations at the Graduate School of Toyo Eiwa University, in Tokyo, Japan, and he is a lecturer, panelist, commentator, and speaker at various academic and other forums on topics including humanitarian aid, IHL, disasters, development, and bio-ethics.

Japanese Red Cross Society
President of Japanese Red Cross Society since 2005, Tadateru Konoe has dedicated his entire professional career to domestic and international Red Cross Red Crescent activities.

Before being elected president, Mr. Konoe served his National Society for 14 years as vice president (1991-2005) and as chairman for Japanese Red Cross Academy, which offered post-graduate courses for nurses. He also held the positions of director general of the International Department (1988-1991), director general of the social department (1988), international department deputy director general (1985-1988), and international director (1976-1981) for the Japanese Red Cross Society.

International Federation of Red Cross and Red Crescent Societies (IFRC)
Mr. Konoe has held several posts in the IFRC. He has been a member of the Standing Commission of the Red Cross Red Crescent (1995-2003) and its vice chairman (1999), member of the IFRC finance commission (1985-1993), as well as officer (1972-1975) and director (1981-1985) of the IFRC disaster preparedness bureau where he started in 1972.

Red Cross Red Crescent Relief Missions
Between 1970 and 2008, Mr. Konoe was involved with over 30 Red Cross Red Crescent relief missions around the world. During his career, he has also been a board member in various associations and organizations, in addition to his work with the International Red Cross and Red Crescent Movement.

Ancestry

References

IFRC 2017 - http://media.ifrc.org/ifrc/press-release/italys-francesco-rocca-elected-president-worlds-largest-humanitarian-network/

External links

Japanese Red Cross Society
International Federation of Red Cross and Red Crescent Societies (IFRC)
Standing Commission of the Red Cross and Red Crescent
Tadateru Konoe received the 26th Jean-Henri Dunant Medal

Higo-Hosokawa clan
Konoe family
1939 births
Living people
Gakushuin University alumni
Red Cross personnel